John Smeaton "Jack" Dodson (May 16, 1931 – September 16, 1994) was an American television actor best remembered for the milquetoast character Howard Sprague on The Andy Griffith Show and its spin-off Mayberry R.F.D.  From 1959 until his death in 1994, Dodson was married to television art director Mary Dodson.

Career
In 1966, Andy Griffith hired Dodson for the Howard Sprague role, having previously seen him in Broadway's Hughie. Dodson also portrayed insurance agent Ed Jenkins in the "Lost and Found" episode of The Andy Griffith Show. Dodson also appeared in episodes of My Friend Flicka, Hazel, The Virginian, Maude, Barney Miller (four episodes), Welcome Back Kotter, Archie Bunker's Place, Newhart, Mr. Belvedere, Matlock, Mama's Family, and St. Elsewhere, on which he had a recurring role.

Dodson appeared as an airplane passenger caught up in a murder plot in a 1973 episode of Hawaii Five-0. In 1967, Dodson appeared in the episode "A Mighty Hunter Before the Lord" of NBC's The Road West, which aired opposite The Andy Griffith Show. He played Norman Gresham in the 1969 film Angel in My Pocket, and also appeared in two Sam Peckinpah films, The Getaway (1972) and Pat Garrett and Billy the Kid (1973). He also had a small role in the 1974 film Thunderbolt and Lightfoot, which starred Clint Eastwood and Jeff Bridges. His other film appearances included roles in Something Wicked This Way Comes (1983) and A Climate for Killing (1991).

In the late 1970s, he had a recurring role as Mickey Malph, Ralph Malph's optometrist father on Happy Days.

In 1975 he was in the Barney Miller episode "Horse Thief".  In 1979–80, Season 6, he appeared in the episode "Guns".  He appeared again on Barney Miller in the two-part episode "Homicide" in Season 7.

Dodson appeared in all 24 episodes of the CBS romantic sitcom All's Fair during the 1976-77 season.  Set in Washington, D.C., Dodson played Wayne Joplin, a slightly bumbling Democratic senator from an unspecified rural state.  The show lasted just one season. 

In January 1979, Dodson played Bernie, a hard of hearing acquaintance of Mark (David Spielberg), in a comic scene set in a restaurant in One Day at a Time.

In 1983, Dodson returned to Broadway in the revival of You Can't Take It with You. The actor reprised Howard Sprague in the 1986 NBC-TV movie Return to Mayberry, as well as in a 1990 episode of It's Garry Shandling's Show, "The Day Howard Moved In".

In 1986, Dodson appeared as Gus, a bus depot attendant, in the "Steal One Pearl Two" episode of Mama's Family.

Personal life
He died in Los Angeles, California, from heart failure, aged 63, on September 16, 1994.

Dodson's widow, art director Mary Dodson, younger sister of actor Fritz Weaver, died on February 15, 2016.

Filmography & Television

References

External links

1931 births
1994 deaths
Male actors from Pittsburgh
American male film actors
American male stage actors
American male television actors
20th-century American male actors